Labels Unlimited is a series of books designed to give an illustrated overview of influential record labels.

Publications 
Warp by Rob Young (Black Dog Publishing,)
Rough Trade by Rob Young (Black Dog Publishing,)
Ace by David Stubbs (Author) & Rob Young (Editor) (Black Dog Publishing,)
Immediate Records by Simon Spence (Black Dog Publishing,)
Ninja Tune: 20 Years of Beats & Pieces by Stevie Chick (Author) & Peter Quicke (Editor) (Black Dog Publishing,)

Series of books